Baderna  (Italian: Mompaderno) is a village in Istria region of Croatia. The settlement is administered as a part of the City of Poreč and the Istria County. According to the 2011 census, the village has 240 inhabitants. It is connected by the D21 road.

Sources

Populated places in Istria County